Elizabeth Sawyer Norton (1887–1985) was an American artist, known for her bronze sculptures, paintings, and printmaking. The subject of her work often featured animals, landscapes and/or portraits. She lived in Palo Alto, California, from 1919 until her death in 1985.

Early life and education 
Elizabeth Sawyer Norton was born December 16, 1887 in Chicago, Illinois to lawyer James Sanger Norton (1844–1896) and Frances Julia Rumsey (1850–1933).

Norton studied fine art at the Art Institute of Chicago in 1910. She continued her studies at Art Students League of New York with Frank DuMond, the National Academy of Design of New York and the Chase School (which later became Parsons School of Design).

While still living in New York City, one of her students was sculptor, Katharine Underhill (born 1892).

Career 
Norton had a successful career and exhibited her art in many galleries in New York City. She had made artistic contributions to exhibitions at the Smithsonian Institution throughout her career. 

She had an older sister named Frances Sanger Norton (married name, Brown) that had moved to Palo Alto, California because her husband Harry Brown was a professor in the Philosophy Department at Stanford University. Norton traveled to California in 1915 to attend to Panama–Pacific International Exposition (PPIE) and to visit her sister. She returned four years later in 1919 to move to Palo Alto, after struggling with bouts with the flu. Her brother-in-law Harry Brown designed her home at 353 Lowell Avenue. 

When Norton moved to California she became interested in printmaking, prior to which she primarily worked in sculpture, pastels, and oil paint. Norton was a founding member of the Palo Alto Art Club (now the Pacific Art League) in 1921. Norton was a member of the California Society of Etchers; Palo Alto Art Club (now known as the Pacific Art League); American Federation of Arts; and San Francisco Women Painters.

Death and legacy 
In the last 20 years of Norton's life she lived at Channing House, a retirement community in Palo Alto. Norton died on August 7, 1985 in Palo Alto, California and is buried in Chicago at the Graceland Cemetery.

Her work is in many public museum collections including the Metropolitan Museum of Art, the Fogg Museum of Art, Yale University Art Gallery, Nelson-Atkins Museum of Art, Fine Arts Museums of San Francisco (FAMSF), the Smithsonian Institution's National Portrait Gallery, among others.

The Pacific Art League of Palo Alto has dedicated a solo-exhibition gallery in her name, the "Elizabeth Norton studio" and the "Elizabeth Norton Distinguished Service Award".

Her bronze bust of David Starr Jordan is on display at Hoover Institution at Stanford University.

Exhibitions 
 1920 – Stanford University, Stanford, California
 1926 – Series of animal wood block prints, Gump's, San Francisco, California
 1929 – Courvoisier Gallery, San Francisco, California
 1939 – Golden Gate International Exposition, San Francisco, California
 1942 – solo exhibition of sculptures and watercolors, California State Library, Sacramento, California
 1942 – National Academy of Design, New York City, New York
 1944 – American Color Print Society, New York City, New York
 1946 – Wichita Art Association, Wichita, Kanas
 1950 – Stanford University, Stanford, California

References 

1887 births
1985 deaths
People from Palo Alto, California
School of the Art Institute of Chicago alumni
Art Students League of New York alumni
National Academy of Design alumni
Parsons School of Design alumni
American women printmakers
American women sculptors
20th-century American women artists
Artists from Chicago